Anderson County is a county in the U.S. state of Texas. Located within East Texas, its county seat is Palestine. As of the 2020 United States census, the population of Anderson County was 57,922. Anderson County comprises the Palestine micropolitan statistical area. Anderson County was organized in 1846, and was named for Kenneth Lewis Anderson (1805-1845), the last vice president of the Republic of Texas.

History

Native Americans
Native Americans friendly to the settlers resided in East Texas before the Kiowa, Kickapoo, Kichai, Apache, and Comanche relocated to the territory. These tribes hunted, farmed the land, and were adept traders. By 1772, they had settled on the Brazos at Waco and on the Trinity upstream from present Palestine. The Tawakoni branch of Wichita Indians originated north of Texas, but migrated south into East Texas. From 1843 onward, the Tawakoni were part of treaties made by both the Republic of Texas and the United States.

On May 19, 1836, an alliance of Comanche, Kiowa, Caddo, and Wichita attacked Fort Parker (Limestone County), killing and taking settlers captive. The survivors escaped to Fort Houston, which had been erected in Anderson County in 1835 as protection against Indians. Some early residents of Anderson County were related to Cynthia Ann Parker, who was among the captives.

In October 1838, Gen. Thomas Jefferson Rusk conducted a raid against hostile Indians at Kickapoo, near Frankston. This ended the engagements with the Indians in East Texas for that year.

Anglo settlement
In 1826, empresario David G. Burnet received a grant from the Coahuila y Tejas legislature to settle 300 families in what is now Anderson County. Most of the settlers came from the southern states and Missouri.

Baptist leader Daniel Parker and eight other men organized the Pilgrim Predestinarian Regular Baptist Church in Lamotte, Illinois in 1833. This entire group migrated to the Texas frontier, arriving in Austins Colony in November 1833, and establishing Fort Parker (Limestone County) in 1834. In October 1834, in consequence of "their members were becoming scattered in a wilderness," the Church agreed to adjourn until the majority of their members settled. 

After the Texas Revolution and the attack on Fort Parker, Daniel Parker and some of the survivors moved to Fort Houston (Anderson County). They established a new community south of the fort.

Incorporation
The First Legislature of the State of Texas formed Anderson County from Houston County on March 24, 1846. The county was named for Kenneth Lewis Anderson. Palestine was named the county seat.

Anderson County voted for secession from the Union. When the American Civil War began, former Palestine district judge Judge John H. Reagan served in the cabinet of the Confederate government as postmaster general, being captured at the end of the war and spending 22 months in solitary confinement. During Reconstruction, District Nine Court Judge Reuben A. Reeves, a resident of Palestine, was removed from office as "an obstruction to Reconstruction" in part because of his refusal to allow blacks to participate as jurors in the judicial process.

In 1875, the International – Great Northern Railroad placed its machine and repair shops and general offices in Palestine, causing the community to double in size over the next 5 years. For a time, it was a rough railroad town, dominated by male workers.

White violence against blacks occurred in the county, most frequently by lynchings of black men. But in July 1910, at least 22 blacks were killed in white rioting near Slocum, a majority-black community, in what is called the Slocum Massacre.  Racial and economic tensions had been high in the post-Reconstruction era  and southern states had disenfranchised blacks and imposed Jim Crow in furtherance of white supremacy. Anderson County tied for 13th place in a list of the 25 American counties with the highest number of lynchings between 1877 and 1950 (all were located in the South).

Oral tradition in the African-American community holds that as many as 200 blacks may have been killed in the massacre. An estimated 200 whites rioted and attacked blacks on the roads, in the fields, and in Slocum on July 29–30, 1910. Many black homes were burned, and black families fled for their lives, having to abandon their property and assets. This town is about 20 miles east of the county seat at Palestine.

At the time, as was usual, white newspapers described such events as a "race riot" by blacks. Texas newspapers had contributed to problems by reporting false rumors that 200 blacks were arming. Afterward, 11 men were arrested and seven were indicted, including James Spurger, said by many to be the instigator, but no prosecution resulted. The massacre had been preceded by racial tensions, rumors, and, for 6 months, at least one lynching per month of Blacks in East Texas. 

In January 2016, the state installed a highway historical marker in Slocum to recognize this unprovoked white attack on the black community. It was part of a history of white violence against blacks.

In 1926, the Humble Oil and Refining Company, in partnership with the Rio Bravo Company, started an exploration drilling program along Boggy Creek, in what turned our to be the Boggy Creek salt dome. On 10 November 1927, the Elliott and Clark No. 2, 150 feet to the west, was completed as a gas well. On 4 February 1928, the first oil-producing well in Anderson County, the Humble-Lizzie Smith No. 1, was completed, producing 80 BOPD. By May 1931, 80 wells had been drilled in the Boggy Creek Oil Field, 6 of which produced gas, 33 oil, and 41 were dry holes.

The Fairway Oil Field was discovered in 1960, and straddles the border of Anderson and Henderson Counties. Oil is produced from the Lower Cretaceous James Limestone member of the Pearsall formation.

The Gus Engeling Wildlife Management Area was purchased by the state between 1950 and 1960, much of it formerly owned by Milze L. Derden. The area was renamed in 1952 for Gus A. Engeling, the first state biologist assigned to the area who was killed by a poacher on December 13, 1951.

Geography

Anderson County is situated at the threshold of two ecoregions, the piney woods to the east, and the East Central Texas forests, also referred to as post oak savanna to the west. The terrain of Anderson County consists of hills carved by drainages and gullies, with numerous lakes and ponds. The Trinity River flows southward along the west boundary line of the county; the Neches River flows southward along its east boundary line, and Brushy Creek flows southeastward through the central portion of the county. The terrain slopes to the south and east, with its highest points along the midpoint of its northern boundary line at 551' (168m) ASL.

The county is wholly located within area codes 430 and 903.

Major highways

  U.S. Highway 79
  U.S. Highway 84
  U.S. Highway 175
  U.S. Highway 287
  State Highway 19
  State Highway 155
  State Highway 294

Adjacent counties

 Henderson County (north)
 Cherokee County (east)
 Houston County (south)
 Leon County (southwest)
 Freestone County (west)

Protected areas

 Big Lake Bottom Wildlife Management Area (part)
 Gus Engeling Wildlife Management Area
 Neches River National Wildlife Refuge (part)
 Richland Creek Wildlife Management Area (part)

Lakes

 Big Twin Lake
 Cox Lake
 Crystal Lake
 Hudson Lake
 Lake Dogwood
 Lake Frankston
 Lost Prairie Lake
 Pineywoods Lake
 Spring Lake
 Williams Lake

Communities

City
 Palestine (county seat)

Towns
 Elkhart
 Frankston

Unincorporated areas

 Alderbranch
 Bethel
 Blackfoot
 Bois d'Arc
 Bradford
 Brushy Creek
 Cayuga
 Cronin
 Crystal Lake
 Elmtown
 Elmwood
 Fosterville
 Greens Bluff
 Long Lake
 Massey Lake
 Montalba
 Mound City (partly in Houston County)
 Neches
 Pert
 Salmon
 Slocum
 Springfield
 Swanson Hill Church
 Tennessee Colony
 Todd City
 Tucker
 Wells Creek
 Yard

Ghost towns

 Jarvis
 Wild Cat Bluff

Population ranking

The population ranking of the following table is based on the 2020 census of Anderson County.

† county seat

Demographics

From its initial population of 2,684 in 1850, Anderson County's population increased to 55,109 people at the 2000 U.S. census. By the publication of the 2020 United States census, its population further grew to 57,922, though the 2020 tabulation is a decline of negative 0.9% from 2010's 58,458 residents at the 2010 U.S. census.

Among the growing population of Anderson county, its racial and ethnic makeup has remained predominantly non-Hispanic or non-Latino white, although its Hispanic and Latino American population of any race increased to consist of more than 11,000 residents as of 2020; the increase in Hispanic and Latino American residency reflected nationwide trends of diversification since the 2020 census. Of note, its African American communities have remained relatively the same, though experiencing a slight decline; multiracial Americans have increased to 2.73% of the population.

Consisting of 16,555 households according to the 2020 American Community Survey's 5-year estimates, there was a homeownership rate of 71.5%. Among the population, the median gross rent was $829 against the statewide median of $1,082. The median value of an owner-occupied housing unit was $110,000, and the median mortgage was $1,102; housing units without a mortgage had a median monthly cost of $441. In 2000, there were 15,678 households, 34.10% had children under the age of 18 living with them, 55.50% were married couples living together, 13.20% had a female householder with no husband present, and 27.70% were not families. About 24.80% of all households were made up of individuals, and 11.80% had someone living alone who was 65 years of age or older.

In 2000, the median income for a household in the county was $31,957, and for a family was $37,513. Males had a median income of $27,070 versus $21,577 for females. The per capita income for the county was $13,838.  About 12.70% of families and 16.50% of the population were below the poverty line, including 21.60% of those under age 18 and 16.60% of those age 65 or over. In 2020, its median household income grew to $45,847 and 14.1% of the population lived at or below the poverty line. The impoverished communities in Anderson County consisted of 21.5% of residents under the age of 18, and 9.9% were aged 65 and older.

Government and politics

Government 
Anderson County is governed by a commissioners' court. It consists of the county judge, who is elected at-large and presides over the full court, and four commissioners, who are elected from the county's four single-member precincts.

County commissioners

County officials

Constables

State prisons
The Texas Department of Criminal Justice operates state prisons for men in the county. The Beto Unit has the Correctional Institutions Division Region II maintenance headquarters.

Courts

Justices of the peace

County court at law 
Jeff Doran, a Republican, is the judge of the county court at law.

District courts

Politics
Anderson is a strongly Republican county, voting Republican in every election since 1980 (as of 2020). The county last voted Democratic in 1976, when Jimmy Carter won 57% of the county's votes. Hillary Clinton managed to win just 19.8% of the vote in the county, the least of any presidential candidate since 1944.

Education
These school districts serve areas in Anderson County:

 Athens Independent School District (partial)
 Cayuga Independent School District
 Elkhart Independent School District (partial)
 Frankston Independent School District (partial)
 La Poynor Independent School District (partial)
 Neches Independent School District
 Palestine Independent School District
 Slocum Independent School District
 Westwood Independent School District

Media
Anderson County is part of the Dallas/Fort Worth DMA. Local TV media outlets include: KDFW-TV, KXAS-TV, WFAA-TV, KTVT-TV, KERA-TV, KTXA-TV, KDFI-TV, and KDAF-TV. Other nearby TV stations that provide coverage for Anderson County come from the Tyler/Longview/Jacksonville market and they include: KLTV, KTRE-TV, KYTX-TV, KFXK-TV, and KETK-TV.

Newspapers serving Anderson County include the Palestine Herald-Press in Palestine and the weekly online Frankston Citizen in Frankston.

See also

 National Register of Historic Places listings in Anderson County, Texas
 Recorded Texas Historic Landmarks in Anderson County
 East Texas Oil Field
 :Category:People from Anderson County, Texas
List of counties in Texas

Further reading
 E.R. Bills wrote The 1910 Slocum Massacre: An Act of Genocide in East Texas (2014) about white mobs rioting and killing at least 22 blacks in Anderson County in July 1910, and driving off hundreds more.

References

External links

 Anderson County government
 
 Anderson County from the Texas Almanac
 Anderson County from the TXGenWeb Project
 Anderson County Agrilife extension profile at Texas A&M University
 View historic Anderson County materials, hosted by the Portal to Texas History

 
1846 establishments in Texas
Populated places established in 1846